Musaabad-e Sofla (also Romanized as Mūsáābād-e Soflá) is a village in Rumiani Rural District, Suri District, Rumeshkhan County, Lorestan Province, Iran. It lies north of both Padarvand-e Sofla and Padarvand-e Olya, and north-west of Musaabad-e Olya. At the 2006 census, its population was 492, in 102 families.

References 

Populated places in Rumeshkhan County